Kentucky Route 82 (KY 82) is a  state highway in the U.S. state of Kentucky. The highway connects rural areas of Estill and Powell counties with Clay City.

Route description
KY 82 begins at an intersection with KY 89 (Winchester Road) southwest of Clay City, within Estill County. It travels to the northeast and curves to the north-northeast. It passes Lorrison Cemetery before curving to the east-northeast and crosses Twin Creek. The highway heads to the northeast and crosses over Plum Branch, which marks the Powell County line. It crosses over the Red River before curving to the north. Upon entering Clay City, it intersects the eastern terminus of KY 1028 (Snow Creek Road). It curves to the northeast and meets its northern terminus, an interchange with Bert T. Combs Mountain Parkway and KY 15 (Main Street/Winchester Road).

Major intersections

See also

References

0082
Transportation in Estill County, Kentucky
Transportation in Powell County, Kentucky